Hidden Springs State Forest is a conservation area on  in Shelby County, Illinois, United States.

2008 closing
Hidden Springs State Forest was one of eleven state parks slated to close indefinitely on November 1, 2008, due to budget cuts by then-Illinois Governor Rod Blagojevich. After delay, which restored funding for some of the parks, a proposal to close seven state parks and a dozen state historic sites, including Hidden Springs, went ahead on November 30, 2008. After the impeachment of Illinois Governor Blagojevich, new governor Pat Quinn reopened the closed state parks in February. In March 2009 Quinn announced he is committed to reopening the state historic sites by June 30, 2009.

References

External links

DNR Hidden Springs State Forest site

Illinois state forests
Protected areas of Shelby County, Illinois
Protected areas established in 1960
1960 establishments in Illinois